Deadsquad is an Indonesian death metal band formed in 2006 in Jakarta. The band was initially started as a project by guitarist Ricky Siahaan of Seringai and Stevie Item of Andra and The Backbone, but later developed into a full band.

Career

Early formation 
Deadsquad was formed in early 2006. Guitarists Stevie Item and Ricky Siahaan wanted to make a project band to fulfill their desire to play metal. Bassist Bonny Sidharta of the band Tengkorak and drummer Andyan Gorust, the former member of Siksakubur were invited to complete the formation. After Ricky Siahaan resigned in June 2006, Prisa Adinda of Zala was recruited to replace him. Shortly thereafter Babal was recruited to be a vocalist. They started to name the band Deadsquad around these times. In November 2007 Prisa Adinda left the band. Her successor Coki Bollemeyer of Netral joined the band one year after, precisely in October 2008. In the same month, singer Daniel Mardhany of the band Abolish Conception joined the band, replacing Babal.

Horror Vision 
Horror Vision was released on 9 March 2009 by Rottrevore Records, coincided with Lamb of God concert in Jakarta. The album was also re-released by Malaysian label Dark Colloseum. The album consist of 8 tracks. Musically influenced by bands like Dying Fetus, Necrophagist, and Sepultura, the first track of the album Pasukan Mati tells about the brutality of right-wing fascist mob that are counterproductive. The guitar on this album was influenced by Steve Vai. However, the bass and vocals were not "audible". On "Manufaktur Replika Baptis", they called it tells a coercion of choosing religion in Indonesia. They also covered "Arise" as a tribute to Sepultura.

Second album and Bonny's departure 
Deadsquad released the second album Profanatik in November 2013 through Armstretch Records. Bassist Bonny Sidharta left the band in March 2014. There is no official replacement has been made. However, the band hires Arslan Musyfia from the band Carnivored to fulfill bass position. They went through a couple of session player to fill in such as Anak Agung Gde (ex-Villes, Killing Me Inside, and Synystra) and Welby Cahyadi for some time until their original bassist Bonny returns to the band.

Musical styles 
The main genre of the band is death metal, mixed with technical, old school, new school, and sometimes with jazz fusion. In early career, they jammed and played songs from Slayer, Anthrax, and Sepultura. They are also influenced by Necrophagist, Visceral Bleeding, Spawn of Possession, Disavowed, Decrepit Birth, and Nile.

Band members

Current members 
 Stevie Item – guitars (2006–present)
 Kharisma – guitars (2015–present)
 Roy Ibrahim – drums (2020–present)
 Shadu Rasjidi – bass (2021–present)
 Vicky Mono – vocals (2022–present)

Former members 
 Ricky Siahaan – guitars (2006)
 Babal – vocals (2006–2008)
 Prisa Adinda – guitars (2006–2008)
 Bonny Sidharta – bass (2006–2014)
 Coki Bollemeyer – guitars  (2008–2016)
 Andyan Gorust – drums (2006–2017)
 Arslan Musyfia – bass (2014–2017)
 Anak Agung Gde Agung – bass (session player) (2017-2018)
 Daniel Mardhany – vocals (2008–2021)
 Welby Cahyadi – bass (2017–2021)
 Alvin Eka Putra - drums (2018-2020)
 Agustinus Widi – vocals (2021–2022)

Timeline

Discography

Studio albums 
 Horror Vision (2009)
 Profanatik (2013)
 Tyranation (2016)
 Catharsis (2022)

Demo, EP, Singles dan Split Albums 
 Horror Vision Promo 2008 (2008)
 "Pragmatis Sintetis" (single) (2016)
 "Blessphemy" (single) (2018)
 3593 Miles of Everloud Musik! (split) (2018)
 "Paranoid Skizoid" (single) (2021)
 "Curse of The Black Plague" (single) (2021)
 "Enigmatic Pandemonium" (single) (2022)

Awards and nominations 

| Ref.
|-
| style="text-align:left;"| 2010
| "Manufaktur Replika Baptis"
| Favorite Metal Song - Indonesia Cutting Edge Music Awards (ICEMA)
|
|
|-
| style="text-align:left;"| 2012
| "Patriot Moral Prematur"
| Best Death Metal Song - Indonesia Cutting Edge Music Awards (ICEMA)
|
|
|-
| style="text-align:left;"| 2016
| "DeadSquad"
| Best Live Performance - Hammersonic Awards
|
|
|-
| rowspan="4" style="text-align:left;"| 2017
| "Pragmatis Sintetis"
| Karya Produksi Metal/Hardcore Terbaik - Anugerah Musik Indonesia (AMI) Awards
|
|
|-
| "DeadSquad"
| Breakthrough Of The Year - Hammersonic Awards
|
|
|-
| "Tyranation"
| Best Album Of The Year - Hammersonic Awards
|
|
|-
| "DeadSquad"
| Best Metal Performance - Hammersonic Awards
|
|
|-
| rowspan="3" style="text-align:left;"| 2022
| "Catharsis" by Rizki Fathur
| Best Album Design Graphics - Indonesian Music Awards
| 
| 
|-
| "Curse of The Black Plague"
| Best Metal Solo Male/Female/Group/Collaboration - Indonesian Music Awards
| 
| 
|-
| Catharsis
| Best Metal Album - Indonesian Music Awards
| 
|

References

External links 
 DeadSquad on Encyclopaedia Metallum
 DeadSquad on Metal Kingdom
 
 
 
 
 

Musical groups from Jakarta
Musical groups established in 2006
Death metal musical groups
Indonesian heavy metal musical groups
Technical death metal musical groups